Macrocoma crassipes is a species of leaf beetle of Algeria and Morocco described by Édouard Lefèvre in 1876.

References

crassipes
Beetles of North Africa
Beetles described in 1876
Taxa named by Édouard Lefèvre